Darris Love (born April 26, 1980) is an American actor, most notable for his role as Raymond 'Ray' Alvarado in Nickelodeon's The Secret World of Alex Mack.  Since the show's ending in 1998, he has made appearances in episodes of numerous American television shows, including Angel, ER, CSI: Crime Scene Investigation, Without a Trace, and Undressed, "It's Not Fair" by singer Glenn Lewis, Janet Jackson's music video All For You (song) "Someone to Call My Lover" and in the Monica music video "All Eyez On Me".

His other credits include the films Gang Tapes (2001), Sucker Free City (2004), and Janky Promoters (2009).

Darris was also in the music video How to Love by Lil Wayne (2011).

Filmography

Film

Television

References

External links

1980 births
Living people
Alexander Hamilton High School (Los Angeles) alumni
Male actors from Los Angeles
African-American male actors
American male television actors
21st-century African-American people
20th-century African-American people